The men's 200 metre breaststroke event at the 2008 Olympic Games took place on 12–14 August at the Beijing National Aquatics Center in Beijing, China.

Japan's Kosuke Kitajima blasted a new Olympic record of 2:07.64 to strike another breaststroke double, and to defend his title in the event. He registered a straightforward triumph over Brenton Rickard, who earned a silver medal in an Australian record of 2:08.88. France's Hugues Duboscq added a second bronze and third overall to his collection in 2:08.94, finishing just ahead of Canada's Mike Brown by almost a tenth of a second (0.10) with a time of 2:09.03.

Hungary's Dániel Gyurta, silver medalist in Athens four years earlier, finished outside the medals in fifth place at 2:09.22. Earlier in the prelims, he established an Olympic record by winning the final of seven heats in 2:08.68.

U.S. swimmer Scott Spann turned in another sub-2:10 barrier to earn a sixth spot in 2:09.76. Italian tandem Loris Facci (2:10.57) and Paolo Bossini (2:11.48) closed out the field. Bossini set a new Olympic record of 2:08.98 to shave 0.46 seconds off Kitajima's mark in Athens, until Gyurta took three-tenths of a second (0.30) off the record time a few minutes later.

Notable swimmers failed to reach the top 8 final, featuring American Eric Shanteau, who entered the Games while battling testicular cancer, and Kazakhstan's Vladislav Polyakov, who finished fifth in Athens four years earlier. Norway's Alexander Dale Oen, silver medalist in the 100 m breaststroke, placed seventeenth in 2:11.30, but missed the semifinals by 0.11 seconds.

Records
Prior to this competition, the existing world and Olympic records were as follows.

The following new world and Olympic records were set during this competition.

Results

Heats

Semifinals

Semifinal 1

Semifinal 2

Final

References

External links
Official Olympic Report

Men's breaststroke 200 metre
Men's events at the 2008 Summer Olympics